Penola is an unincorporated community in Caroline County, in the U.S. state of Virginia.

History
A post office called Penola was established in 1857, and remained in operation until it was discontinued in 1961. Penola is a name derived from a Native American language meaning "cotton".  It was a stop on the Richmond, Fredericksburg and Potomac Railroad in the nineteenth Century which was replaced by, CSXT.

References

Unincorporated communities in Virginia
Unincorporated communities in Caroline County, Virginia
1857 establishments in Virginia